Jason Rullo (born July 17, 1972) is an American drummer, who is one of the founding members of progressive metal band Symphony X.

In 2003, he was featured in a readers' poll for Modern Drummer magazine, where he achieved two awards: second place in the up-and-coming drummer poll, and third place for best recorded performance on Symphony X's The Odyssey (2002). In the same year, he performed on the self-titled debut album by Redemption. He currently teaches drum lessons at Big Beat Studios in New Jersey.

On February 27, 2013, it was announced by Symphony X's management that, during the previous week, Jason was admitted to hospital for heart failure. He spent a week in hospital, and was released after some days. Jason then started a rehab program, and has been told that his recovery will take a minimum of 3–6 months under doctors' care. On March 26, 2013, the band announced that John Macaluso would join them on tour for their South American and European dates, until Jason recovers from such health problems.

In 2019, Jason Rullo formed a new band by the name of "3 Rules" along with guitar player Ron Sanborn and bassist Artha Meadors. They released their debut album "Rule of 3" through a GoFundMe campaign in 2020. In an interview with Sonic Perspectives, Jason Rullo said "This is a real band, not just a project".

Discography

Symphony X
1994: Symphony X
1995: The Damnation Game
1997: The Divine Wings of Tragedy
1999: Prelude to the Millennium (compilation)
2000: V: The New Mythology Suite
2001: Live on the Edge of Forever (live)
2002: The Odyssey
2007: Paradise Lost
2011: Iconoclast
2015: Underworld

Redemption
2003: Redemption

3 Rules 

 2020: Rule of 3

References

External links
Jason Rullo's drum setup at sabian.com

1972 births
Living people
People from Hackensack, New Jersey
American heavy metal drummers
Musicians from New Jersey
Symphony X members
20th-century American drummers
American male drummers
21st-century American drummers
20th-century American male musicians
21st-century American male musicians
American people of Italian descent
Redemption (band) members